A low-residue diet is a diet intended to reduce certain constituents of the bowel, often with consequence for functional behaviour of the bowel. It may be prescribed for patients with ailments or functional gastrointestinal disorders mitigated by fewer and smaller bowel movements each day. 

The diet may be used as part of the bowel preparation before a diagnostic procedure such as colonoscopy or as a short-term therapy for acute stages of gastrointestinal illnesses such as Crohn's disease, diverticulitis, bowel obstruction, and ulcerative colitis. In addition, a low-residue diet is often prescribed  before and/or after abdominal surgery or cancer treatments.

A low-fiber diet is a low-residue diet eliminating dietary fiber in particle. The terms are not always distinguished, but when they are, a low-residue diet will include additional restrictions on foods such as dairy products, which do not contain fiber but do develop residue after digestion. 

If the problem lies with fermentable carbohydrates instead, the patient may be directed to a low-FODMAP diet. Some monotrophic diets, such as the carnivore diet, are implicitly low-residue, but may also sacrifice nutrition.

Dietary guidelines

Standard guidelines
Almost all low-residue diets make the following recommendations:

Variations

Quantity of Fiber
A low-fiber diet is not a no-fiber diet. A 2015 review article recommends less than 10 grams of fiber per day. Other sources recommend that a patient on a low-fiber diet eat no more than 10–15 grams of fiber per day. Some sources recommend serving sizes that contain no more than 2 grams per serving.

Grains
Some diets recommend limiting servings of baked goods to 2 grams per serving. Other diets recommend limiting these servings to just 1 gram per serving. Most diets also recommend eating warm cereals such as cream of wheat, cream of rice, grits, and farina.

Fruits
Some diets allow additional raw fruits such as very soft apricot, canned fruit cocktail, grapes, peaches, papayas, plums, or citrus fruits without membrane, but two rule out all raw fruits. Some allow applesauce, other fruit sauces, or peeled and well-cooked apples.

Vegetables
Many diets specifically recommend tomato sauce and prohibit pickles. Two diets actually limit the well-cooked vegetables to yellow squash without seeds, green beans, wax beans, spinach, pumpkin, eggplant, asparagus, beets, and carrots. Two diets allow some raw vegetables: lettuce, cucumber (without seeds), and zucchini, and one allows raw onion.

Meat and other proteins
Some diets allow smooth peanut butter or smooth nut butters. Some diets allow tofu.

Dairy
Some diets limit dairy to 2 cups per day. One diet allows  of hard cheese. Several diets allow pudding or custard,  sherbet, whipped cream, or ice cream. A couple of diets suggest specific lactose-free products for the lactose intolerant, such as soy milk or whipped cream. One diet prohibits whole milk, half and half, cream, sour cream, and regular ice cream.

Condiments and spreads
Some diets allow mayonnaise, ketchup, sour cream, cream cheese, smooth sauces and salad dressings, plain gravies, or whipped cream. Several diets allow jelly, honey, and syrup. Many prohibit jam, marmalade, and preserves.

Several diets prohibit highly spiced food, but some allow spices, cooked herbs, and seasonings.

Beverages
Several diets specifically prohibit caffeine (two of these allow decaffeinated coffee, tea, and other drinks), but some allow coffee, tea, and carbonated drinks.

Nutritional quality

If the diet must be strict and followed over a long period of time, the intake of fruits and vegetables may not provide adequate amounts of vitamin C and folic acid.  The quantity of calcium may also be inadequate if dairy products are restricted.  In these cases, a multivitamin supplement or liquid nutritional supplement may be needed.

Conditions that may require a low-residue diet
A low-fiber diet may be used to prepare for or recover from various medical procedures:
 Abdominal surgery
 Colonoscopy
 Internal hemorrhoid surgery

A low-fiber diet may also be used during acute stages of the following conditions, to rest the bowels:
 Bowel inflammation
 Crohn's disease
 Diverticulitis
 Ulcerative colitis
 Radiation therapy to the pelvis and lower bowel
 Chemotherapy
 Gastroparesis

Uses

Colonoscopy
The most common preparation for a colonoscopy is a clear liquid diet accompanied by laxatives. However, this may not be the most effective preparation. A 2015 guideline issued by The Standards of Practice Committee of the American Society for Gastrointestinal Endoscopy recommends using a low-residue diet instead, also accompanied by laxatives, because of evidence that it performs at least as well for bowel cleansing and is associated with better patient satisfaction.

Crohn's Disease
Various guides to low-fiber diets suggest their use for short-term management of Crohn's disease, but there is little research to support this. A 2016 review of the research found that a semi-elemental whey hydrolyzed protein (WHP) diet is superior for treatment of Crohn's disease.

Diverticulitis
While a low-fiber diet is generally used for acute diverticulitis, the NIH guidelines recommend a high-fiber diet for patients with diverticulosis (a condition that may lead to diverticulitis).   A Mayo Clinic review from 2011 showed that a high-fiber diet can prevent diverticular disease.

Aviation
In preparation for long-duration toiletless military flights, the crew is sometimes instructed to have a low-residue meal as their last meal before the flight. For example, this was the case with Blackbird pilots.

Terminology

Most sources treat low-fiber and low-residue diets as identical, but some make a distinction based on the difference between fiber and residue. Dietary fiber is the indigestible part of food made from plants. Residue includes not only fiber but also other materials found in the colon after digestion. When this distinction is made, a low-fiber diet simply reduces fiber intake by eliminating or limiting high-fiber foods such as raw fruits and vegetables. A low-residue diet includes restrictions on foods such as dairy products, which do not contain fiber but do develop residue after digestion.

The American Academy of Nutrition and Dietetics' removed the low-residue diet from its Nutrition Care Manual because there is no scientifically accepted quantitative definition of residue and there is no method to determine the residue produced by a food.

See also
Carnivore diet (zero-fiber)
 Dietary fiber
 Gastroenterology
 High-residue diet

References

Diets